Fredericktown is a historic unincorporated community at the confluence of the north and middle forks of Little Beaver Creek in northeastern St. Clair Township, Columbiana County, Ohio, United States.  It lies about six miles north of nearby East Liverpool and about 50 miles west of Pittsburgh.  It is known for its historic buildings and its natural environment.

History
Fredericktown was laid out in 1833 by George Frederick, and named for him. A former variant name was Saint Clair. A post office called Saint Clair operated between 1848 and 1918.

Historic sites
Despite its small size, Fredericktown has a number of historic buildings.  These include an unusual octagonal building which was used variously over the years as a general store, a school and the village post office; two churches (one of which was deconsecrated and is now privately owned); several private homes constructed of locally quarried sandstone; several log cabins; a one-room schoolhouse; a number of barns; and the former Stagecoach Inn, which has been a private home for some years.

Notes

References
The Enchanted Village: The History of Fredericktown, Ohio by Regis Scharf and Gary Winterburn was privately published in 1992.  It has long been out of print, although a new edition is being planned.
St. Clair Township Travel & Tourism Bureau
February 10, 1976 letter from President Gerald R. Ford entitled "Message to the Congress Transmitting Report on Little Beaver Creek, Ohio"
The Ohio Historical Society

Unincorporated communities in Ohio
Unincorporated communities in Columbiana County, Ohio
1833 establishments in Ohio
Populated places established in 1833